Meilong railway station was a railway station in Shanghai which has now been abolished in favor of the new Shanghai South railway station. It was located near Jinjiang Action Park, serving regular trains to and from Hangzhou.

Railway stations in Shanghai